Tighdar-e Olya (also Romanized as Tīghdar-e ‘Olyā; also known as Tīghdar) is a village in Arabkhaneh Rural District, Shusef District, Nehbandan County, South Khorasan Province, Iran. At the 2006 census, its population was 134, in 35 families.

References 

Populated places in Nehbandan County